The 1967 Dwars door België was the 23rd edition of the Dwars door Vlaanderen cycle race and was held on 26 March 1967. The race started and finished in Waregem. The race was won by Daniel Van Ryckeghem.

General classification

References

1967
1967 in road cycling
1967 in Belgian sport